Gray Reed & McGraw LLP is a Texas-based, commercial law firm with offices in Dallas, Houston and Waco. In 2013, Houston Business Journal listed Gray Reed among the top 20 largest law firms in Texas with over 120 attorneys state-wide. Based in Houston, Texas, attorneys for the firm serve as legal advisors to mid-market and large businesses, providing legal services to industries including oil and gas, healthcare, construction, real estate, technology, and food and agriculture.

History 

Gray Reed & McGraw (formerly Looper Reed & McGraw) was founded in August 1985 by three Houston lawyers—including Don Looper, Jim Reed, and Jim McGraw from Reynolds, Allen & Cook. In 1990, the firm opened its Dallas office. By the end of the 1990s, the firm had expanded to more than 50 attorneys and by the end of 2012, the firm had reached 120 attorneys. On January 1, 2014, Looper Reed & McGraw parted ways with Don Looper and changed its name to Gray Reed & McGraw. By 2020, Gray Reed had grown to a 150 lawyer firm.

Notable shareholders and employees

 Hon. Jack Morris Rains, 95th Secretary of State of Texas
 Hon. Jeff Leach, Texas State Representative, District 67 (2013–Present)
 Justice Jim Moseley, Court of Appeals for the Fifth District of Texas  (1996-2014)

References 

Law firms based in Houston